, subtitled Sorcière de gré, pucelle de force ("witch by choice, virgin by obligation"), is a Japanese manga series written and illustrated by Masayuki Ishikawa. Kodansha USA licensed the manga and released the first volume on February 24, 2015. An anime adaptation aired from January to March 2015.

Plot
Set in France during the Hundred Years' War, it follows Maria, who is one of the most powerful witches of her era. She intervenes against the warring nations by using her succubus and incubus familiars to manipulate the opposing factions, as well as large-scale illusions, all for the sake of helping the people and maintaining peace. As a result, she has gained the appreciation of several villagers and the hostility of the Church, which considers her a heretic. Yet Maria is still a virgin and her own familiars tease her about it. As news of her actions spreads, Archangel Michael focuses on Maria and rejects her interference in human affairs. After a direct confrontation, Michael ultimately decides that Maria will lose her magical powers if she loses her virginity and also forbids her from publicly using magic, sending an angel called Ezekiel to oversee this decree.

Characters

A very powerful witch that hates conflicts, and because of her interference in the battles, she's forced by Heaven to stop using magic in front of common people, and the moment she loses her virginity, she will lose her powers. Later, she falls in love with Joseph. It has been hinted that she may be much older than she seems.

Maria's succubus familiar, who enjoys teasing Maria for her virginity and lack of experience. Despite that she's very protective of her mistress.

Maria's incubus familiar who, unfortunately, lacks a penis since Maria doesn't know male anatomy very well. The same as Artemis, he is protective of Maria.

An angel sent by Heaven to ensure that Maria doesn't use magic in public, although Maria and her familiars always find loopholes to do so. She takes the form of a white dove and is nicknamed Popo by Anne and Marias familiars. She eventually comes to sympathize with Maria and prevents herself from killing her when Michael gives her the order. For this insubordination she's sentenced by the archangel to become fallen, but is promised to be reincarnated as a human. Michael commands her to choose the one who will be bearing her and, without hesitating, Ezekiel chooses Maria to become her mother.

A young man serving under Guillaume, who gets Maria's protection and becomes infatuated with the young witch and her dreams. He's also a virgin and tries to support Maria in any way he knows.

A girl that takes a liking towards Maria. A surprising fact is that the female narrator is Anne as a grandmother.

The mother of Anne and daughter of Martha.

Anne's grandmother and a good friend of Maria.

Bernard's uncle and Joseph's master, who follows his nephew's plan into using Maria for their own goals.

A witch from England who fights for whoever pays her. She takes an interest in Maria and tries to convince her of losing her virginity. Later she becomes friends with Maria.

The Head angel of Heaven who, after seeing Anne and Joseph's love for Maria, decides to give her another chance and assigns Ezekiel to watch her.

A shy witch who gives Maria the ingredients to make her medicines. She uses her cat familiar as messenger and to communicate with the other witches. She keeps to herself and hides away in a rundown stone building. She finally leaves her home to help Maria from burning at the stake.

Anime-only characters

A mercenary of the french army who gets upset when Maria interferes with battles, since it means he doesn't get paid. He's assigned by Bernard and Guillaume into killing Maria if she keeps interfering. After killing Yvain, he loses his left arm by a straight cannonball during battle. He survives and fully gives his support to Bernard, receiving a metal arm and becomes the leader of the mercenary group.

A prostitute who works alongside the mercenary company Garfa belongs to. She's the only one who knows Garfa killed Yvain.
	

The leader of the mercenary force Garfa belongs to. He's murdered by Garfa during a battle when he threatens to take away all his earnings and insults his moorish descent.
 

A cunning and ruthless monk from the Roman Catholic Church, who starts manipulating Maria's actions into benefiting him and the French army. He later has a divine revelation when he questions Maria's interventions in jail. He dies when trying to choke Michael in the last episode.

A novice Monk from the Roman Catholic Church who works under Bernard.

The old God of Celtic mythology, whose influence has dwindled with the expansion of Christianity and tries to convince Maria in joining him.

Anime
An anime adaptation aired on January 11, 2015 and ended on March 29, 2015. "Philosophy of Dear World" by ZAQ is the opening song of the anime while "ailes" by TRUE is the ending song.

Episode list

Reception
By February 14, 2010, volume 1 of the manga had sold 81,643 copies. By October 16, 2011, volume 2 had sold 94,578 copies. As of October 13, 2013, volume 3 has sold 57,516 copies.

References

External links
Official anime website 

Anime series based on manga
Comedy anime and manga
Comics set in France
Comics set in the 14th century
Fictional medieval European people
Funimation
Hideyuki Kurata
Historical fantasy anime and manga
Hundred Years' War in fiction
Kodansha manga
Production I.G
Seinen manga
Tokyo MX original programming
Witchcraft in anime and manga
Works about virginity
Angels in television
Succubi in popular culture
Witchcraft in written fiction
Witchcraft in television